Contract B is a concept in Canadian law.
A Contract B is formed when an Owner formally accepts a Bid or, colloquially, a submission of price.  Only a single Contract B is formed between the Owner and the successful bidder.  Tied to the concept of Contract A, Contract B is a place holder in the concept, a marker at the end of a formalized process of equitable treatment of both bidders and owners. In many ways it is more of an academic detail within the Contract A - Contract B concept, but can also be thought of as a label for the actual construction contract.

See also
Contract A
Request For Proposal
reverse auction

References

Contract law